Kasim Sulton (born December 8, 1955) is an American bass guitarist, keyboardist and vocalist. Best known for his work with Utopia, Sulton sang lead on 1980's "Set Me Free," Utopia's only top 40 hit in the United States. As a solo artist, Sulton hit the Canadian top 40 in 1982 with "Don't Break My Heart".

Sulton has been a frequent collaborator, bassist and singer on many of Todd Rundgren's projects and solo tours.

Biography
Sulton attended and graduated in 1973 from Susan E. Wagner High School in Staten Island, New York. He married his high school sweetheart, Laurie Rampulla, and had three children with her. She died of cancer in 2011.

Sulton started his musical career playing piano and vocals for Cherry Vanilla and guitar for Brooklyn-based band Sleepy Hollow before gaining a place in Utopia in 1976. During his time with Utopia, they recorded nine albums and toured extensively until disbanding in 1986, with occasional reunions to the present.

He has toured with Blue Öyster Cult, Meat Loaf, Hall & Oates, Cheap Trick, Patty Smyth, Akiko Yano and Richie Sambora, among many other artists. As a studio musician, he has played on albums by Patti Smith, Indigo Girls and Steve Stevens, and appeared on an album of traditional Irish music by Eileen Ivers. He was a member of Joan Jett's backing band, The Blackhearts, touring with them and playing on Jett's album Up Your Alley (1988) as well as contributing a number of tracks to her compilation album The Hit List (1990).

Sulton was the bassist and sang background vocals on the breakout Meat Loaf album Bat Out of Hell. He and Thommy Price collaborated on an album, Lights On, which Sulton co-wrote. The song "No T.V. No Phone" was featured in the comedy film The Allnighter (1987), starring Susanna Hoffs.

Sulton recorded a solo album on September 4, 2002, entitled Quid Pro Quo. The album was released on Sphere Sound Records, and Sulton played all but two instruments on the album.  He later released another solo album, "3" the fall of 2014, which featured Todd Rundgren on "Clocks All Stopped."

Sulton sang background vocals on Meat Loaf's album Bat Out of Hell II: Back into Hell, joining his backing band, Neverland Express, touring for three years on the Everything Louder Tour. He also recorded on Meat Loaf's album Welcome to the Neighborhood, arranging and singing background vocals on most of the tracks. He went on to become Music director for Meat Loaf, rehearsing Meat Loaf's band, Neverland Express, in preparation for touring. The Very Best of Meat Loaf album was released with three new tracks, one of which, "Is Nothing Sacred", was later re-recorded as a duet with Patti Russo and produced by Sulton, with the track reaching No. 15 on the UK charts. Sulton also produced the Meat Loaf album Storytellers, and toured with the band on the Night of the Proms Tour in Europe and the "Meat Loaf Just Havin' Fun for the Summer" and "Winter" Tour in the United States and Europe, where he and Patti Russo both served as opening acts. He also toured on Meat Loaf's "Couldn't Have Said It Better" tour where he played a short solo acoustic set to open the concert at most venues. One of Meat Loaf's shows on this tour was filmed for the DVD Bat Out of Hell: Live with the Melbourne Symphony Orchestra. Kasim also toured on the 2005 "Hair of the Dog" Tour and the 2006–2007 "Bat Out of Hell III" tour, and he is featured as bassist/backing vocalist on the album. In summer 2008, he rejoined Meat Loaf for The Casa de Carne Tour.

Sulton played bass in the pit orchestra for the Twyla Tharp-choreographed musical based on Billy Joel music called Movin' Out on Broadway.

After a brief stint with the reunited band Scandal in 2004,  Sulton joined The New Cars in 2005, replacing original Cars bassist and co-lead vocalist Benjamin Orr, who died of cancer in 2000. The band also included original Cars band members Elliot Easton and Greg Hawkes as well as Todd Rundgren and Prairie Prince from Journey and The Tubes. An album, It's Alive!, was followed by a tour in 2006, with Sulton singing lead on The Cars' hit "Drive".

Sulton continues to appear live playing bass, keyboards, and guitar on most Todd Rundgren tours, including the 2008–09 "Arena" gigs, 2009–10 performances of the classic album A Wizard, a True Star (1973) in the United States and Europe, and 2010 "TR's Johnson" shows. He was in the band for the six show "Todd/Healing Albums Live" tour that began Labor Day Weekend of 2010 in Akron, Ohio, and played a solo show before the premiere. He also played in the second run of "Todd/Healing Albums Live", a five-show tour that began on 25 March 2011 in Hartford, Connecticut.

In 2011, Sulton replaced Matt Bissonette as the bass player in the Beatles tribute supergroup Yellow Matter Custard.

In 2012, he joined the classic hard rock band Blue Öyster Cult; he remained its bassist until 2017.

In September 2015, Sulton, along with legendary songwriter Paul Williams, led a global virtual songwriting collaboration at Hookist.com. The mission was to write the 1st ever crowd-sourced anthem to be performed at FacingAddiction.org's concert and rally on The National Mall on 4 October 2015, headlined by Steven Tyler, Sheryl Crow and Joe Walsh among others. The theme of the song was "Celebrate Recovery" and the goal was to reduce the stigma associated with addiction. Sulton, Williams and Dr. Mehmet Oz opened the show and led 10,000 people in a singalong of "Voice Of Change" at the base of the Washington Monument. Sulton also led a singalong of the song on The Dr. Oz Show which quickly went viral.

A new Kasim Sulton solo album, recorded through 2019 and 2020, was released in 2021 by Deko Records. It includes contributions from notable musicians from Kasim's past and present including Prairie Prince, Mickey Curry, Keith Scott, Gil Assayas, Phil Thornalley and John Siegler.

Discography 

 L Steve Hillage (1976, CBS Records)
 Ra Utopia (1977, Bearsville Records)
 Oops! Wrong Planet Utopia (1977, Bearsville Records)
 Bat Out of Hell Meat Loaf (1977, Cleveland International Records)
 Back to the Bars Todd Rundgren (1978, Bearsville Records)
 TRB Two Tom Robinson Band (1979, EMI Records)
 Guitars & Women Rick Derringer (1979, Blue Sky Records)
 Frankie Eldorado Frankie Eldorado (1980, August Music)
 Wasp Shaun Cassidy (1980, Warner Bros.)
 Adventures in Utopia Utopia (1980, Bearsville Records)
 Deface the Music Utopia (1980, Bearsville Records)
 Bad for Good Jim Steinman (1981, Epic Records)
 Swing to the Right Utopia (1982, Bearsville Records)
 Kasim (1982, EMI America)
 Utopia Utopia (1982, Network Records)
 Party of Two The Rubinoos (1983, Berserkly Records)
 Oblivion Utopia (1984, Passport Records)
 POV Utopia (1985, Passport Records)
 Good Music Joan Jett (1986, CBS Associated Records)
 Lights On Price/Sulton (1986, CBS Associated Records)
 The Burns Sisters The Burns Sisters (1986, Columbia Records)
 Never Enough Patty Smyth (1987, Columbia Records)
 Dream of Life Patty Smith (1987, Arista Records)
 Trivia Utopia (1987, Gem Records)
 Unfinished Business Ronnie Spector (1987, Columbia Records)
 Safety Love David Drew (1988, MCA Records)
 Up Your Alley Joan Jett (1988, Blackheart Records)
 Nearly Human Todd Rundgren (1989, Warner Bros. Records)
 Indigo Girls Indigo Girls (1989 Epic Records)
 Atomic Playboys Steve Stevens (1989 Warner Bros.)
 Anthology Utopia (1989 Rhino Records)
 Tall Stories Johnny Hates Jazz (1991 Virgin Records)
 Rock and Roll Hero Meat Loaf (1992 Sony Records)
 Redux '92: Live in Japan Utopia (1992 BMG)
 Patty Smyth Patty Smyth (1992) 
 Quid Pro Quo (2002, Sphere Sound)
 Traditional Irish Music Eileen Ivers (1994)
 Welcome to the Neighborhood Meat Loaf (1995)
 Required Rocking Rick Derringer (1996)
 Wild Blue Eileen Ivers (1996)
 Falling Into You	Celine Dion (1996)
 Free Spirit Bonnie Tyler (1996)
 Palookaville Glen Burtnik (1996)
 Live Around the World Meat Loaf (1996)
 Oblivion, POV & Some Trivia Utopia (1996)
 With a Twist Todd Rundgren (1997)
 I.De.A. Kyosuke Himuro (1997)
 Indigo Girls / Strange Fire / Nomads – Indians – Saints Indigo Girls (1998)
 Somewhere/Anywhere? Todd Rundgren (1998)
 Greatest Hits Featuring Scandal Patty Smyth (1998)
 The Basement Tapes Kasim Sulton (1998)
 Official Bootleg Tokyo '79 Utopia (1999)
 City In My Head Utopia (1999)
 Tough Room ... This World Ricky Byrd (1999)
 One Long Year Todd Rundgren (2000)
 Todd Rundgren Live  King Biscuit CD Todd Rundgren (2000)
 Quid Pro Quo Kasim Sulton (2002)
 The Wonderground Boy Meets Girl (2003)
 Couldn't Have Said It Better Meat Loaf (2003)
 Pushing Red Buttons Pushing Red Buttons (2003)
 Back On Track Lulu (2004)
 Bat Out of Hell Live Meat Loaf and the Melbourne Symphony Orchestra (2004)
 Utopia Live in Boston: 1982 DVD Utopia (2004)
 Unstoppable Sounding Rick (2005)
 An Evening With Kasim Sulton: Live in Atlanta (DVD 2006)
 Never Be Famous Sounding Rick (2013)
 All Sides Kasim Sulton (2009)
 3 (Three) Kasim Sulton (2014)
 Poppy Wisdom Sounding Rick (2015)
 Live Bootleg Kasim Sulton (2017)
  White Knight Todd Rundgren (2017)
  Astral Drive Astral Drive' aka Phil Thornalley (2018)
  One (and Done) Kül Friis (2021)
  Orange Astral Drive (2021) 
  Kasim 2021'' Kasim Sulton (2021)

References

External links
 Kasim's webpage
 Authorized fansite
 Kasim Sulton radio interview on Rundgren Radio
 Career Retrospective Interview from September 2015 with Pods & Sods

1955 births
Living people
American new wave musicians
American rock bass guitarists
American male bass guitarists
American rock keyboardists
American rock singers
Blue Öyster Cult members
Neverland Express members
The New Cars members
Scandal (American band) members
People from Staten Island
Hall & Oates members
Utopia (American band) members
20th-century American guitarists
Yellow Matter Custard members